Corbin Kaufusi (born April 12, 1993) is an American football offensive tackle for the Memphis Showboats of the United States Football League (USFL). He played college football at BYU.

Early years
Kaufusi attended Timpview High School in Provo, Utah. Helped team win state championships in 2008 and 2009.

College career
After spending two years on his mission for the Church of Jesus Christ of Latter-day Saints in South Korea, Kaufusi played for the first time at BYU in 2016 and finished his career in 2018. Kaufusi was also a member of the basketball team from 2014 to 2017.

Professional career

New Orleans Saints
On April 28, 2019, Kaufusi after going undrafted was signed by the New Orleans Saints. He was waived during final roster cuts on August 30, 2019.

Kaufusi was drafted in the 10th round during phase three in the 2020 XFL Draft by the St. Louis BattleHawks, but did not sign with the league.

New York Jets
On October 15, 2019, Kaufusi was signed to the New York Jets practice squad. He signed a reserve/future contract with the Jets on December 30, 2019.

On September 5, 2020, Kaufusi was waived by the Jets and signed to the practice squad the next day. His practice squad contract with the team expired after the season on January 11, 2021.

San Francisco 49ers
On January 15, 2021, Kaufusi signed a reserve/futures contract with the San Francisco 49ers. He was waived on August 24, 2021, but was re-signed three days later. He was waived on August 31, 2021 and re-signed to the practice squad the next day. He was released on September 8, 2021. He was re-signed to the practice squad on November 11. He was released on December 9.

Tampa Bay Bandits
Kaufusi was drafted in the sixth round by the Tampa Bay Bandits during the first night of the 2022 USFL Draft on February 22, 2022. He was placed on injured reserve on June 10, 2022.

Memphis Showboats
Kaufusi and all other Tampa Bay Bandits players were all transferred to the Memphis Showboats after it was announced that the Bandits were taking a hiatus and that the Showboats were joining the league.

Personal life
His father, Steve Kaufusi, was the defensive line coach for BYU and his brother, Bronson Kaufusi, last played for the Green Bay Packers. His mother, Michelle Kaufusi, is the current Mayor of Provo.

References

External links
BYU Cougars football bio
BYU Cougars basketball bio

1993 births
Living people
American football defensive ends
American people of Tongan descent
American men's basketball players
American Mormon missionaries in South Korea
Basketball players from Utah
BYU Cougars football players
BYU Cougars men's basketball players
Latter Day Saints from Utah
New Orleans Saints players
New York Jets players
Players of American football from Utah
San Francisco 49ers players
Sportspeople from Provo, Utah
Tampa Bay Bandits (2022) players